The Expedition of Abdullah ibn Unais, also known as the Assassination of Khaled bin Sufyan was the first attack against the Banu Lahyan, which took place in the month of Muharram in the year A.H. 3. It was reported that Khaled bin Sufyan Al-Hathali (also known as Hudayr, the chief of the Banu Lahyan tribe), considered an attack on Madinah and that he was inciting the people on Nakhla or Uranah to fight Muslims. So Muhammad sent Abdullah ibn Unais to assassinate him. After cutting off Khaled bin Sufyan's head at night, Unais brought it back to Muhammad.

Attack on the chief of Banu Lahyan
After the migration to Medina Muhammed also faced the daunting task of protecting those who had migrated to Medina with him and the residents of Medina who had allowed him and his followers to settle in Medina. In this vein, he proactively tried to gather information of possible attacks and acted to crush the enemies. This expedition was executed on a similar news. It was reported that Khaled bin Sufyan Al-Hathali (also known as Hudayr, the chief of the Banu Lahyan tribe), considered an attack on Madinah and that he was inciting the people on Nakhla or Uranah to fight Muslims. 
Abdullah ibn Unais found Hudayr in the company of his wife, when asked about his identity. Unais replied: "I A man from the Arabs; it came to me that you were gathering (any army) for this man (i.e. Prophet ﷺ). Hence I came to you in connection with this matter." He (Khalid bin Sufayn) said: "I am (engaged) in this (work)." I then walked along with him for a while; when it became convenient for me, I dominated him with my sword until he became cold (dead)."

Khaled bin Sufyan trusted him. Then Unais asked to talk to him privately, once, while conversing, Abdullah ibn Unais walked a short distance with ibn Sufyan, and when an opportunity came he struck him with his sword and killed him. After killing ibn Sufyan, he cut off his head and brought that to Muhammad. Muhammad gave him his staff as a reward and said:

This will function as a sign of recognition for you and me, on the day of resurrection (Musnad Ahmad 3:496)Ibn Hisham 2/619.

This assassination had the effect of silencing the Banu Lahyan, for some time. But another branch of Banu Lihyan wanted to take revenge for the killing of their leader, Khaled bin Sufyan and were thinking of means to do so.

Islamic sources

Biographical literature
This event is mentioned in Ibn Hisham's biography of Muhammad. The Muslim jurist Ibn Qayyim Al-Jawziyya also mentions the event in his biography of Muhammad, Zad al-Ma'ad. Modern secondary sources which mention this, include the award winning book, Ar-Raheeq Al-Makhtum (The Sealed Nectar).

The Muslim jurist Tabari, also mentions the event in his biography of Muhammad:

Hadith literature
The incident is also mentioned in the Sunni Hadith collection Sunan Abu Dawud:

The event is also mentioned in Musnad Ahmad 3:496.

See also
List of expeditions of Muhammad
Military career of Muhammad
Muslim–Quraysh War

References

Notes

624
Campaigns ordered by Muhammad